Angelopoulos is a Greek surname meaning "son of Angelos". The feminine form is Angelopoulou (Αγγελοπούλου). Notable people with the surname include:

Athanasios Angelopoulos (born 1939), Greek professor
Gianna Angelopoulos-Daskalaki (born 1955), Greek businesswoman
Giorgos Angelopoulos (born 1974), Greek businessman
Jaime Angelopoulos (born 1982), Canadian sculptor
Lycourgos Angelopoulos (1941-2014), director of the Greek Byzantine Choir
Manolis Angelopoulos (1939-1989), Greek singer
Panagiotis Angelopoulos (born 1973), Greek businessman
Theo Angelopoulos (1935-2012), Greek film director
Theodore Angelopoulos (born 1943), Greek businessman
Vassilis Angelopoulos (born 1965), THEMIS principal investigator at the University of California's Berkeley Space Sciences Laboratory, in Berkeley, Calif.

Greek-language surnames
Surnames
Patronymic surnames